Crail Custom House is an historic building in Crail, Fife, Scotland. Dating to the late 17th century, it is a Category A listed building.

Inscriptions on the buildings eastern and western skewputts reference Robert Wood (a ship captain) and Helen Daw.

Gallery

See also
 List of listed buildings in Crail, Fife
 List of Category A listed buildings in Fife

References

Category A listed buildings in Fife
Custom houses in the United Kingdom
Listed buildings in Crail
17th-century establishments in Scotland